National Route 449 is a national highway of Japan connecting Motobu, Okinawa and Nago, Okinawa in Japan, with a total length of 20.3 km (12.61 mi).

References

National highways in Japan
Roads in Okinawa Prefecture